Van Gogh is the debut studio album from the Serbian and former Yugoslav rock band Van Gogh, released in 1986. Soon after the album release Van Gogh disbanded, only to reunite in 1990.

Van Gogh is the band's only album that does not feature Zvonimir Đukić on vocals, but on guitar only. The album was originally released by PGP-RTB in 1986, and rereleased in 2001 by Metropolis Records.

Track listing
All the music was written by Zvonimir Đukić. All the lyrics were written by Goran Milisavljević, except for "Tragovi prošlosti" lyrics, written by Đukić and Milisavljević.
"Menjam se"  – 3:33
"Glorija"  – 3:14
"Noćno nebo"  – 3:51
"Kako zove se..."  – 4:12
"Tragovi prošlosti"  – 3:44
"Ja znam"  – 4:15
"Tvoj smeh"  – 3:37
"Tiho hodam"  – 4:36
"Za kim zvona zvone"  – 5:12

Personnel
Goran Milisavljević - vocals
Zvonimir Đukić - guitar
Predrag Popović - bass guitar
Srboljub Radivojević - drums
Đorđe Petrović - keyboards, recording, producer

References 
Van Gogh at Discogs
 EX YU ROCK enciklopedija 1960-2006,  Janjatović Petar;

External links
Van Gogh at Discogs

Van Gogh (band) albums
1986 debut albums
PGP-RTB albums
Alternative rock albums by Serbian artists